Stapylton may refer to:

People 
Stapylton baronets, two extinct English baronetcies created for persons with the surname Stapylton
Granville Chetwynd-Stapylton (1823–1915), British Army officer, became colonel of the Duke of Cornwall's Light Infantry
John Stapylton Habgood, PC (born 1927), British retired Anglican bishop, academic, and life peer
Robert Hunt Stapylton Dudley Lydston Newman, 1st Baron Mamhead (1871–1945), known as Sir Robert Newman, British politician
John Stapylton Grey Pemberton (1860–1940), Member of Parliament, Vice-Chancellor of Durham University 1918–1919
Brian Stapylton (1657–1727), of Myton in Yorkshire, English Member of Parliament
Henry Stapylton (died 1679), English politician who sat in the House of Commons in 1648 and 1660
John Stapylton (1683–1733), of Myton in Yorkshire, English Member of Parliament
Philip Stapylton (1603–1647), of Warter-on-the Wolds in Yorkshire, English Member of Parliament
Robert Stapylton (died 1669), English courtier, dramatic poet and translator
John Stapylton-Smith (born 1961), retired New Zealand javelin thrower

Places 
Stapylton County, one of the 141 Cadastral divisions of New South Wales
Stapylton, Queensland, locality in the City of Gold Coast, Queensland, Australia

See also
Stapleton (disambiguation)
Stapleton (surname)